Khorkhog is a barbecue dish in Mongolian cuisine. Khorkhog is made by cooking pieces of meat inside a container which also contains hot stones and water, and is often also heated from the outside.

Preparation
To make khorkhog, Mongolians take lamb (goat meat can be substituted) and cut it into pieces of an appropriate size while leaving the bones attached.  The cook then places ten to twenty fist-sized stones over a fire.  When the stones are hot enough, the rocks and the meat are placed in the chosen cooking container.  Metal milk jugs are a traditional and typical choice, although any container sturdy enough to hold the hot rocks will serve.

The heat of the stones and the steam will cook the meat inside the jug.  The cook can also put the jug on a fire or the stove if the stones are not hot enough.  The stones will turn black from the heat and the fat they absorb from the lamb.  The jug remains covered while the cook listens to and smells the meal to judge when it is ready.  The stones can take up to an hour and a half to cook the meat sufficiently. When the dish is ready, the cook hands out portions of meat along with the hot stones which are tossed from hand to hand and are said to have beneficial properties.  Diners usually eat khorkhog with their fingers, although knives may be used to slice the meat off the bone.

The dish is said to be a relatively modern, 20th century invention, dating back to the time of the Soviet Union's military presence in Mongolia, when Mongolians began cooking with cast-off Red Army water jugs.  It is a variation of boodog, an older Mongolian dish made with hot stones in which the meat is cooked inside an animal skin. Khorkhog is a popular dish in Mongolian cuisine, but it is generally not served in restaurants.

See also

 List of lamb dishes
 Mongolian cuisine
 Asado

References

External links
Khorkhog Recipe

Mongolian cuisine
Buryat cuisine
Tuvan cuisine
Kalmyk cuisine
Altai cuisine
Barbecue
Lamb dishes